Verin Sasunik is a village in the Ashtarak Municipality of the Aragatsotn Province of Armenia. It was depopulated in 1960 and resettled in 1989.

References

Populated places in Aragatsotn Province

Populated places established in 1989